Naa Ashorkor (born 24 November 1988) also known as Nisirine Naa Ashorkor Mensah-Doku, is a Ghanaian actress and a media personality who currently works at Asaase Radio a radio station in Accra. She is known for starring in "The Perfect Picture" (2009), by Shirley Frimpong-Manso and Iroko TV's Poisoned Bait - a movie directed by Leila Djansi.

She won the Award for Best Actress in 2010 at the African Movie Academy awards for her role played in "The Perfect Picture" (2009). Naa Ashorkor also starred alongside Yvonne Okoro, Joselyn Dumas, John Dumelo.

Career 

Naa Ashorkor, along with Actor Chris Attoh hosted the Vodafone Ghana Music Awards 2016 (VGMAs 2016)  held at the Accra International Conference Centre. She also hosted the Miss Maliaka pageant for eight years. In 2008, she featured in her first movie role by Shirley Frimpong Manso. Askorkor started off as a presenter with Starr 103.5 FM where she hosted a mid morning show dubbed The Zone.

She is a business woman who runs two ventures: Jaarno, a digital foodstuffs market and April Communications, which is into theatre productions. She was a presenter with the Multimedia Group from 2017 till 2020 where she hosted the programmes Showbiz A-Z and Strong and Sassy. She moved to Asaase Radio at the end of June 2020 and hosts the shows Between Hours and Just Us. In March 2021, she was the host for the 3Music Awards.

Ashorkor is a brand ambassador for Unilever Ghana, leading their campaign for Lifebuoy Hand-Washing Ambassador, Verna Mineral Water, advocating under the Verna Mineral Water Autism Awareness Ambassador and also DKT International Ghana which she serves as the Lydia Contraceptives Brand Ambassador.

Ashorkor had been involved in several popular television commercials notably for Tigo Ghana's Drop That Yam and Yensor Nkoaa commercials.

Personal life 
Naa Ashorkor married her longtime partner Ahuma Cabutey Adodoadji in 2014. On 15 August 2017, she announced the birth of her son via news outlets and social media. She announced the birth of her second child, also a son on 1 July 2019.

Filmography 
Film

Television

Stage

Radio

References 

Ghanaian film actresses
Living people
1988 births
University of Ghana alumni
Ghanaian radio presenters
Ghanaian women radio presenters